Medlands Beach is in Oruawharo Bay on the east coast of Great Barrier Island in the Auckland Region of New Zealand. Auckland Council describes it as the most accessible beach on the island. It is one of the island's main tourist areas but is little developed. The small settlement of Medlands consists of permanent houses and holiday baches, some behind the dunes, sheltered from winds from the sea, and others elevated for a view.

Medlands Beach is directly south of Kaitoke Beach, with the Sugar Loaf hill and Pitokuku Island in-between. Sugar Loaf hill offers great views of the beach but is a privately owned farm with cattle and bulls and cannot be climbed without permission from the landowners - the Blackwells. Alternatively good views of the beach is offered from the road connecting Medlands to Claris. The beach is a "sweep of white sand" 2.1 kilometers long that can be walked both ways in 90 minutes. Halfway along the beach is Memory Rock, also called Medlands Rock, with a short informal walking track to the summit, where there are views across the bay.

At the northern end of the beach is an exposed beach surf break that offers reliable surfing conditions during most of the year. At the south-eastern end of the beach is Shark Alley, a sheltered spot for swimming and launching boats. It has a small stream with several pāteke (brown teal ducks) and a Department of Conservation campsite which can host up to 120 people from Christmas until mid-February.

The settlement has Great Barrier Island's only traditional church building, St John's Community Church, which is used ecumenically. Medlands has a number of accommodation providers, but no grocery stores or food retailers. It is a 4-kilometre drive from Great Barrier Aerodrome and Claris, which has a general store, a New Zealand Post shop, a petrol station and other facilities.

Demographics
Medlands Beach is part of the larger Barrier Islands statistical area.

Medlands Beach had a population of 75 at the 2018 New Zealand census, a decrease of 12 people (−13.8%) since the 2013 census, and a decrease of 21 people (−21.9%) since the 2006 census. There were 48 households, comprising 48 males and 27 females, giving a sex ratio of 1.78 males per female. The median age was 53.8 years (compared with 37.4 years nationally), with 9 people (12.0%) aged under 15 years, 9 (12.0%) aged 15 to 29, 45 (60.0%) aged 30 to 64, and 15 (20.0%) aged 65 or older.

Ethnicities were 92.0% European/Pākehā, 4.0% Māori, and 4.0% other ethnicities. Percentages may add up to more than 100% as people may identify with multiple ethnicities. 

Although some people chose not to answer the census's question about religious affiliation, 56.0% had no religion and 24.0% were Christian.

Of those at least 15 years old, 12 (18.2%) people had a bachelor's or higher degree, and 15 (22.7%) people had no formal qualifications. The median income was $19,700, compared with $31,800 nationally. 3 people (4.5%) earned over $70,000 compared to 17.2% nationally. The employment status of those at least 15 was that 21 (31.8%) people were employed full-time, 9 (13.6%) were part-time, and 6 (9.1%) were unemployed.

Education
Kaitoke School is a coeducational full primary (years 1-8) school with a roll of  students as of  The school was established in 1988, replacing an earlier Kaitoke School.

References

Great Barrier Island
Beaches of the Auckland Region
Populated places in the Auckland Region